Oxyprothepin decanoate, sold under the brand name Meclopin, is a typical antipsychotic which was used in the treatment of schizophrenia in the Czech Republic but is no longer marketed. It is administered by depot injection into muscle. The medication has an approximate duration of 2 to 3 weeks. The history of oxyprothepin decanoate has been reviewed.

References

Abandoned drugs
Antipsychotic esters
Decanoate esters
Dibenzothiepines
Piperazines